Presidential elections were held in the Central African Republic on 15 March 1981. They were the first national elections of any sort since 1964, the first elections since the overthrow of longtime ruler Jean-Bédel Bokassa in 1979, and the first multiparty presidential elections since independence. Five candidates—incumbent president David Dacko, Ange-Félix Patassé, François Pehoua, Henri Maïdou and Abel Goumba—stood in the election. 

The elections were won by Dacko, who had been restored to power two years earlier as part of Operation Barracuda, which overthrew Emperor Bokassa I (Jean-Bédel Bokassa). Dacko tried to pose as the inheritor of Barthélemy Boganda, the national hero who founded the country.

Results

References

Central African Republic
Presidential elections in the Central African Republic
1981 in the Central African Republic